Baharestan ( lit. "The Spring Garden") is an Iranian newspaper in the Fars region. The Concessionaire of this newspaper was Habibollah Noubakht and it was published in Shiraz since 1920.

See also
List of magazines and newspapers of Fars

References

Newspapers published in Iran
Persian-language newspapers